Myiozetetes is a small genus of passerine birds in the tyrant flycatcher family. The four species occur in tropical Central and South America.

Taxonomy
The genus Myiozetetes  was introduced by the English zoologist Philip Sclater in 1859 with the rusty-margined flycatcher as the type species. The name of the genus combines the Ancient Greek muias "fly" and zētētēs "searcher".

Species
The genus contains four species:

Description
The upperparts are olive-brown, and the wings and tail  are brown with only faint rufous fringes. The underparts are yellow and the throat is white. Young birds lack the red-orange crown stripe of the adult, and have chestnut fringes to the wing and tail feathers. The best distinction between the species is the head pattern: Vermilion-crowned, social and rusty-margined flycatchers have strong black-and white head markings like the great kiskadee, whereas grey-capped and dusky-chested flycatchers have greyish heads, with a short weak eyestripe in the former.

Myiozetetes flycatchers sally out from an open perch in a tree to catch insects in flight. They sometimes hover to take small berries. They breed in cultivation, pasture, and open woodland with some trees, building a large roofed nest from stems and in a bush, tree or on a building. The nest is often constructed near a wasp, bee or ant nest, or the nest of another tyrant flycatcher. The nest site is often near or over water. The typical clutch is two to four brown or lilac-blotched cream or white eggs, laid between February and June.

References 

 Hilty, Steven L. (2003): Birds of Venezuela. Christopher Helm, London. 
 Stiles, F. Gary & Skutch, Alexander Frank (1989): A guide to the birds of Costa Rica. Comistock, Ithaca. 

 
Bird genera
Higher-level bird taxa restricted to the Neotropics
Taxa named by Philip Sclater